HMNZS Hinau has been the name of two ships:

 , commissioned 1942
 , commissioned 1985 and decommissioned 23 January 2007

Royal New Zealand Navy ship names